Pangasius is a genus of medium-large to very large shark catfishes native to fresh water in South and Southeast Asia. The term "pangasius" is sometimes used to specifically refer to the commercially important basa fish, P. bocourti.

Taxonomy
In 1993, Pangasius was one of two extant genera (along with Helicophagus) in the family Pangasiidae. At this point, it was split into four subgenera. Pangasius (Pangasianodon) included P. gigas and P. hypophthalmus and was diagnosed by the absence of mandibular barbels, the absence of teeth in adults and the presence of a single-lobed swimbladder. Pangasius (Pteropangasius) included P. micronema and P. pleurotaenia and was diagnosed by four lobes in the swimbladder and with multiple segments in the last lobe. Pangasius (Neopangasius) included P. nieuwenhuisii, P. humeralis, P. lithostoma, P. kinabatanganensis, diagnosed by palatal teeth arranged in a single large patch and high vertebral counts. Pangasius (Pangasius) was the final subgenus and had no diagnostic features, containing the remaining species. These subgeneric classifications were confirmed in 2000 except for Neopangasius, found to be polyphyletic and to be part of Pangasius (Pangasius), thus leaving three subgenera.

Since then, the subgenera have been variably recognized as separate. P. gigas and P. hypophthalmus have been classified in the genus Pangasianodon, and P. micronemus and P. pleurotaenia in the genus Pseudolais (with Pteropangasius as a junior synonym).

In 2011, Pangasius was sixth in the National Fisheries Institute’s "Top 10" list of the most consumed seafood in the United States. The Top 10 is based on tonnage of fish sold. According to the NFI, this mild-flavored white-fleshed fish is farmed in Asia, and is being used increasingly in food service. It is finding its way onto restaurant menus and into stores, as well, where one may see it called basa, tra, or swai. They are either called Panga, Pangas or Pangasius, In Malaysia and Indonesia , Pangasius are called Ikan Patin , while Malaysian Chinese call Pangasius 巴丁鱼. Some species like Pangasius Nasutus , Pangasius Djambal and Pangasius Sanitwongsei are expensive food fish in Malaysia , Pangasius Sanitwongsei was also a common fish in aquarium trade and sport fishing.

Species

Currently, 22 recognized species are in this genus:

 Pangasius bocourti Sauvage, 1880 (basa fish)
 Pangasius conchophilus Roberts & Vidthayanon, 1991 (snail eating pangasius)
 Pangasius djambal Bleeker, 1846 
 Pangasius elongatus Pouyaud, Gustiano & Teugels, 2002 (elongated pangasius)
 Pangasius humeralis Roberts, 1989
 Pangasius kinabatanganensis Roberts & Vidthayanon, 1991 (kinabatang pangasius)
 Pangasius krempfi Fang & Chaux, 1949
 Pangasius kunyit Pouyaud, Teugels & Legendre, 1999
 Pangasius larnaudii Bocourt, 1866 (spot pangasius)
 Pangasius lithostoma Roberts, 1989
 Pangasius macronema Bleeker, 1851
 Pangasius mahakamensis Pouyaud, Gustiano & Teugels, 2002
 Pangasius mekongensis Gustiano, Teugels & Pouyaud, 2003 (mekong pangasius)
 Pangasius myanmar Roberts & Vidthayanon, 1991 (myanmar pangasius)
 Pangasius nasutus (Bleeker, 1863) (long nosed pangasius)
 Pangasius nieuwenhuisii (Popta, 1904)
 Pangasius pangasius (Hamilton, 1822) (yellowtail catfish)
 Pangasius polyuranodon Bleeker, 1852
 Pangasius rheophilus Pouyaud & Teugels, 2000
 Pangasius sabahensis Gustiano, Teugels & Pouyaud, 2003
 Pangasius sanitwongsei Smith, 1931 (giant pangasius)
 Pangasius silasi Dwivedi et al., 2017

Fossil record
The single known fossil species of this genus, P. indicus, is reported from the Paleogene period of Sipang, Sumatra, either from the Eocene or the Oligocene.

References

Pangasiidae
Paleogene genus first appearances
Catfish genera
Taxa named by Achille Valenciennes
Freshwater fish genera
Extant Paleogene first appearances